Yoon Doo-joon (born July 4, 1989), better known mononymously as Doojoon, is a South Korean singer and actor. He is the leader of the South Korean boy group Highlight.

Early life 
Yoon Doo-joon was born in Goyang, South Korea on July 4, 1989.  His dream of becoming a high school Physical Education teacher changed suddenly during his second year of high school after watching MTV's Big Bang Documentary. His parents and teachers didn't agree with him at first, though he pleaded with them to register him for music school and he soon started auditioning to become a singer.

Yoon then became a trainee of JYP Entertainment and was featured in the Mnet documentary Hot Blooded Men, a reality program that shows the preparation for their debut, with 2AM and 2PM, but he was eliminated along the course of the show.

He then moved to Cube Entertainment and was featured as a rapper in AJ's "Wipe the Tears". He later debuted as the leader of Beast. Their journey leading up to debut was showcased in their MTV documentary MTV B2ST.

Yoon graduated from Kyung Hee Cyber University in post-modern musicology.
He attended Dongshin University as a student majoring in Broadcast Entertainment, under a full scholarship, along with three other members of Beast.

Yoon enlisted for his mandatory military service as ROK Army on August 24, 2018, and was discharged on April 10, 2020.

Career

Group career

Yoon debuted as a leader of Beast in 2009. In 2016, he left label Cube Entertainment along with several other members. They have since reformed to promote as Highlight under Around Us Entertainment.

Solo career 
Before his debut with Beast, Yoon auditioned for High Kick Through the Roof and was offered a role in the sitcom, but he turned it down to focus on his music career. A month after his debut, he became a member of the reality-variety series Danbi, a segment part of MBC's Sunday Sunday Night line-up. The show ended with its last broadcast on August 15, 2010.

Yoon  was then chosen to model on an advertisement for premium jeans brand Buckaroo along with Shin Se-kyung. He was also featured for G.NA's song "I'll Back Off So You Can Live Better" music video along with fellow Beast member, Junhyung.

Yoon debuted as an actor when he was cast in MBC's daily sitcom More Charming By The Day and All My Love. On December 29, 2010, he was awarded with the Rookie Comedy Award from the 2010 MBC Entertainment Awards for his performance.

In 2013, he featured in spy action drama Iris II. The same year, he starred tvN's slice-of-life drama Let's Eat.
He reprised his role in the second season, Let's Eat 2 which aired in 2015. The same year, he starred in the MBC drama special Splash Splash Love.

In 2018, Yoon starred in the romance drama Radio Romance. The same year, he reprised his role in the third season of the Let's Eat franchise.

On April 13, 2020, it was announced that he would be a part of the cast of TvN variety show, 4 Wheeled Restaurant.

On July 27, 2020, Yoon released his first solo mini album, Daybreak.

On May 1, 2021, Highlight’s agency Around Us Entertainment announced, “Yoon Doojoon has been confirmed to appear in the drama ‘There is No Goo Pil Soo’, which will begin filming in July.”

Discography

Extended plays

Singles

As lead artist

Collaborations

As featured artist

Songwriting credits

Filmography

Film

Television series

Reality show

Variety show

Hosting

Awards and nominations

References

External links

Highlight (band) members
1989 births
K-pop singers
Living people
Cube Entertainment artists
South Korean male singers
South Korean pop singers
South Korean male idols
South Korean male film actors
South Korean male television actors
South Korean beatboxers
South Korean male web series actors
Kyung Hee Cyber University alumni
People from Goyang